James Benjamin Parker (July 31, 1857 – April 13, 1907) was an African-American man most noted for attempting to stop Leon Czolgosz from assassinating President William McKinley.

Early life
Born in Atlanta, Georgia in 1857 to enslaved parents, Parker worked a variety of jobs including as a newspaper salesman for the Southern Recorder and as a constable. He later moved to Chicago, Illinois, where he was employed as a waiter, before returning to Atlanta, where he appears in city directories as a mail carrier for the United States Postal Service. This was followed by additional moves to Saratoga, New York, to New York City, and, finally, to Buffalo, New York, where he took a job with a catering company at the Pan-American Exposition's Plaza Restaurant.

McKinley assassination

Background
Parker had been laid off from his job at the Plaza Restaurant prior to September 6, 1901, and used that day to visit the Exposition's Hall of Music, where President William McKinley was receiving members of the public.

The recent assassinations of European leaders by anarchists, and often virulent denouncements of McKinley in the newspapers of William Randolph Hearst, combined to concern McKinley's private secretary George B. Cortelyou that there might be an attempt on the president's life. Cortelyou arranged for tight security after the president twice refused to cancel his appearance. A contingent of up to 75 City of Buffalo police and exposition security guards monitored the doors to the Hall of Music and patrolled the queue waiting to see the president. Persons who made it far enough to approach McKinley finally had to pass through a cordon of U.S. Army soldiers who had been instructed to quickly surround anyone who appeared suspicious. Since the Spanish–American War, the United States Secret Service had been protecting McKinley, and two special agents, backed by several Buffalo police detectives, stood near the president.

Shooting

There was, at the time, a general rule that anyone approaching the president must do so with their hands open and empty. However, the heat of the day meant this custom was not being enforced as many people were carrying handkerchiefs with which to wipe away perspiration. A long line of exposition attendees queued to meet the president. The man in front of Parker in the queue, Leon Czolgosz, used the heat to conceal a pistol underneath a handkerchief. As Czolgosz approached McKinley, he fired the weapon twice, hitting the president at point blank range. After the second shot, according to a later account by United States Secret Service special agent Samuel Ireland, Parker punched Czolgosz in the neck then tackled him to the ground. Parker was quickly joined by one of the soldiers and a Buffalo policeman in restraining Czolgosz who was badly pummeled by more soldiers, police, and bystanders before McKinley could order the beating to stop.

An unnamed witness cited in a Los Angeles Times story said that "with one quick shift of his clenched fist, he [Parker] knocked the pistol from the assassin's hand. With another, he spun the man around like a top and with a third, he broke Czolgosz's nose. A fourth split the assassin's lip and knocked out several teeth."

In Parker's own account of the event, given in a newspaper interview a few days later, he said,

In a separate interview given to the New York Journal, Parker remarked "just think, Father Abe freed me, and now I saved his successor from death, provided that bullet he got into the president don't kill him."

Aftermath

After the shooting, Parker was approached with several commercial offers, including from one company who wanted to sell his photograph. He refused, stating in a newspaper interview that "I do not think that the American people would like me to make capital out of the unfortunate circumstances. I am glad that I was able to be of service to the country." Prior to McKinley's death, when his outlook for recovery appeared promising, the Savannah Tribune, an African-American newspaper, trumpeted of Parker "the life of our chief magistrate was saved by a Negro. No other class of citizens is more loyal to this country than the Negro."

Despite initial optimism that McKinley would recover, the president died about a week later of complications arising from his wound. Czolgosz was quickly tried and convicted in the Erie County Superior Court and, exactly 45 days after McKinley's death, executed, his body afterwards being dissolved in acid. Parker was not called to testify, though his attempt to save the president was later lauded in a speech given by Booker T. Washington. Preacher Lena Doolin Mason wrote a poem praising Parker for his actions, "A Negro In It", casting him as the latest in a long line of African Americans who risked their lives in service to their country and admonishing white Americans to recognize that bravery with the cessation of lynchings.

Later life
After the assassination, Parker left Buffalo, and after spending the Christmas holidays with his family in Atlanta, traveled through the United States giving lectures to enthusiastic crowds at such places as Nashville, Tennessee, Long Branch, New Jersey, Brooklyn, New York, and Pittsburgh, Pennsylvania.  On the first anniversary of the assassination, Parker was the principal speaker at a memorial service at the People's AME Zion Church in Providence, Rhode Island. Although there was talk of Parker being appointed as a messenger to the United States Senate, nothing seems to have come of it, and he subsequently went to work as a traveling salesman for the New York City based Gazetteer and Guide, an African-American interest magazine written for Pullman Porters and railroad and hotel employees. Details on his later activities were, for many years, unknown.

In early 1907, Parker was in Atlantic City, New Jersey where he had been "roaming about as a vagrant for some time." He was arrested by local police and confined as a "lunatic." "Friends" appeared to help Parker, who was released to their custody.

They made their way to Philadelphia, Pennsylvania, where Parker was placed in a boardinghouse at 246 South 9th Street. On the night of Sunday, March 24, 1907, a policeman noticed Parker on a West Philadelphia street "acting queerly" and took him into custody. In the station house, Parker "raved all night." The following morning, a police surgeon examined Parker and determined that "his mind was subject to hallucinations and that it was dangerous for him to be at large" and Parker was therefore admitted to Philadelphia State Hospital at Byberry.

Parker was only at the hospital for a short time; he died at 2:10 pm on April 13, 1907, the cause being given as myocarditis with a contributory cause given as nephritis. As his body was not claimed for burial, it was sent to the "Anatomical Board" where it eventually was dissected by students of the Jefferson Medical College.

References

1857 births
People from Atlanta
Assassination of William McKinley
1907 deaths
African-American people
People from Buffalo, New York
People from Philadelphia